City of Heroes is a massively multiplayer online role-playing game.

City of Heroes may also refer to:

 City of Heroes (Arrow), episode of television series
 City of Heroes (album), by Michael Kiske and Amanda Somerville
 City of Heroes (comics)
 City of Heroes Collectible Card Game